The South Africa national rugby union team, commonly known as the Springboks (colloquially the Boks, Bokke or Amabokoboko), is the country's national team governed by the South African Rugby Union. The Springboks play in green and gold jerseys with white shorts. Their emblem is a native antelope, the Springbok, which is the national animal of South Africa. The team has been representing South Africa in international rugby union since 30 July 1891, when they played their first test match against a British Isles touring team. They are currently the reigning World Champions and have won the World Cup on 3 occasions, (1995, 2007, and 2019). The Springboks are equalled with the All Blacks with 3 World Cup wins. 

The team made its World Cup debut in 1995, when the newly democratic South Africa hosted the tournament. Although South Africa was instrumental in the creation of the Rugby World Cup competition, the Springboks did not compete in the first two World Cups in 1987 and 1991 because of international anti-apartheid sporting boycotts. The Springboks defeated the All Blacks 15–12 in the 1995 final, which is now remembered as one of the greatest moments in South Africa's sporting history, and a watershed moment in the post-Apartheid nation-building process.

South Africa regained the title as champions 12 years later, when they defeated England 15–6 in the 2007 final. As a result of the 2007 World Cup tournament the Springboks were promoted to first place in the IRB World Rankings, a position they held until July the following year when New Zealand regained the top spot. They were named 2008 World Team of the Year at the Laureus World Sports Awards. South Africa then won a third World Cup title, defeating England 32–12 in the 2019 final. As a result of this, the South African National Rugby Union Team were named 2020 World Team of the Year at the Laureus World Sports Awards for a second time.

The Springboks also compete in the annual Rugby Championship (formerly the Tri-Nations), along with their Southern Hemisphere counterparts Argentina, Australia and New Zealand. They have won the Championship on four occasions in Twenty-Four competitions and are the only team to have won a version of the competition and the Rugby World Cup in the same year.

For almost a hundred years, South Africans have been proud of the performance of their rugby union team, the Springboks are known throughout the world, even by non-rugby specialists. Rugby union is very popular in South Africa, the one which is practiced preferably by the most talented sportsmen of the country. Many teams have had their biggest defeats to the Springboks; including Australia, Italy, Scotland, Uruguay and Wales.

History

First internationals: 1891–1913 

The first British Isles tour took place in 1891, at Diocesan College. These were the first representative games played by South African sides. The tourists won all twenty matches they played, conceding only one point.
The British Isles' success continued on their tour of 1896, winning three out of four tests against South Africa. South Africa's play greatly improved from 1891, and their first test win in the final game was a pointer to the future.
In 1903 the British Isles lost a series for the first time in South Africa, drawing the opening two tests before losing the last 8–0. Rugby was given a huge boost by the early Lions tours, which created great interest in the South African press. South Africa would not lose another series—home or away—until 1956.

The first South African team to tour the British Isles and France occurred during 1906–07. The team played tests against all four Home Nations. England managed a draw, but Scotland was the only one of the Home unions to gain a victory. The trip instilled a sense of national pride among South Africans.
The South Africans played an unofficial match against a 'France' team while the official French team were in England; the Springboks won 55–6.
It was during this tour that the nickname Springboks was first used.

The 1910 British Isles tour of South Africa was the first to include representatives from all four Home unions. The tourists won just one of their three tests. The Boks' second European tour took place in 1912–13. They beat the four Home nations to earn their first Grand Slam, and also defeated France.

Inter war 

By the first World War, New Zealand and South Africa had established themselves as rugby's two greatest powers. A Springbok tour to New Zealand and Australia in 1921 was billed as "The World Championship of Rugby". The All Blacks won the first Test 13–5, The Springboks recovered to win the second Test 9–5, and the final Test was drawn 0–0, resulting in a series draw.

The 1924 British Lions team lost three of the four Tests to the Springboks, drawing the other. This was the first side to pick up the name Lions, apparently picked up from the Lions embroidered on their ties.
The All Blacks first toured South Africa in 1928, and again the Test series finished level. The Springboks won the first Test 17–0 to inflict the All Blacks' heaviest defeat since 1893. The All Blacks rebounded to win the second Test 7–6. After a Springbok win in the third Test, the All Blacks won 13–5 to draw the series.

Despite winning South Africa's second Grand Slam, the Springbok tourists of 1931–32 were an unloved team, due to their tactics of kicking for territory. It was successful however, winning against England, Ireland, Scotland and Wales, as well as defeating all their Welsh opponents for the first time.

In 1933, Australia toured South Africa, with the Springboks winning the series 3–2.

In 1937 South Africa toured New Zealand and Australia and their 2–1 series win prompted them to be called "the best team to ever leave New Zealand".

The British Isles toured South Africa again in 1938, winning the majority of their tour matches. The Springboks secured easy victories in the first two tests. However, the Lions bounced back to record a win in the third test, for the first Lions win on South Africa soil since 1910.

Post-war era 
Danie Craven was appointed coach in 1949, and started his coaching career winning ten matches in a row, including a 4–0 whitewash of New Zealand on their 1949 tour to South Africa.

The 1951–52 team that toured Europe was considered amongst the finest Springbok sides to tour. The team won the Grand Slam as well as defeating France. Hennie Muller captained the side. The South African highlight of the tour was a 44–0 defeat of Scotland. The team finished with only one loss, to London Counties, from 31 matches.

In 1953, Australia toured South Africa for the second time and although they lost the series, they defeated South Africa 18–14 in the second test. The 1955 British Lions tour to South Africa four-test series ended in a draw.

In 1956, Springboks toured Australasia the All Blacks won its first series over the Springboks, in "the most bitterly fought series in history."

When France toured South Africa in 1958 they were not expected to compete. France exceeded expectations and drew 3–3. The French then secured a Test series victory with a 9–5 victory.

Anti-apartheid protests: 1960s–1970s 
In 1960, international criticism of apartheid grew in the wake of The Wind of Change speech and the Sharpeville massacre. The Springboks increasingly became the target of international protest. The All Blacks toured South Africa in 1960, despite a 150,000 signature petition opposing it. The Springboks avenged their 1956 series defeat by winning the four-match test series 2–1 with one draw. that same year the Springboks toured Europe, and they defeated all four Home unions for their fourth Grand Slam.

The 1962 British Lions tour to South Africa lost three of the four tests, drawing the other. In 1963 the touring Wallabies beat the Springboks in consecutive tests, the first team to do so since the 1896 British team. In 1964, in Wales' first overseas tour they played one test match against South Africa, losing 3–24, their biggest defeat in 40 years.

South Africa had a poor year in 1965, losing matches in a tour of Ireland and Scotland, and in a tour of Australia and New Zealand.

The planned 1967 tour by the All Blacks was cancelled by the New Zealand Rugby Football Union after the South African government refused to allow Maori players. In 1968 the Lions toured and lost three Tests and drew one.

Next year in the 1969–70 Springbok tour to the UK and Ireland the Springboks lost test matches against England and Scotland, and drew against Ireland and Wales. Throughout the tour however, large anti-apartheid demonstrations meant that several matches had to be played behind barbed wire fences.

In 1970 the All Blacks toured South Africa once again—after the South African government agreed to treat Maoris in the team and Maori spectators as 'honorary whites'. The Springboks won the test series 3–1.

In the Springbok tour of Australia in 1971, the Springboks won all three tests. As in Britain three years before, however, massive anti-apartheid demonstrations greeted the team, and they had to be transported by the Royal Australian Air Force after the trade unions refused to service planes or trains transporting them. A planned tour of New Zealand for 1973 was blocked by New Zealand Prime Minister Norman Kirk on the grounds of public safety.

The Lions team that toured South Africa in 1974 triumphed 3–0 (with one drawn) in the test series. A key feature was the Lions' infamous '99 call'. Lions management had decided that the Springboks dominated their opponents with physical aggression, so decided "to get their retaliation in first". At the call of '99' each Lions player would attack their nearest rival player. The "battle of Boet Erasmus Stadium" was one of the most violent matches in rugby history.

Sporting isolation: 1970s–1980s 
The 1976 All Blacks tour of South Africa went ahead, and the Springboks won by three Tests to one, but coming shortly after the Soweto riots the tour attracted international condemnation. Twenty-eight countries boycotted the 1976 Summer Olympics in protest, and in 1977 the Gleneagles Agreement discouraged any Commonwealth sporting contact with South Africa. In response to the growing pressure, the segregated South African rugby unions merged in 1977. A planned 1979 Springbok tour of France was blocked by the French government.

The Lions toured South Africa in 1980, losing the first three tests before winning the last one.

The 1981 Springbok tour of New Zealand went ahead in defiance of the Gleneagles Agreement. South Africa lost the series 1–2. The tour and the massive civil disruption in New Zealand had ramifications far beyond rugby. In 1981, Errol Tobias became the first non-white South African to represent his country when he took the field against Ireland. South Africa sought to counteract its sporting isolation by inviting the South American Jaguars to tour. The team contained mainly Argentinian players. Eight matches were played between the two teams in the early 1980s—all awarded Test status. In 1984, England toured losing both test matches; of the players selected, only Ralph Knibbs of Bristol refused to tour for political reasons.

Due to the isolation from apartheid, from 1985 to 1991, South Africa did not play a single test match against an established country, although South Africa did play some matches against makeshift teams.
In 1985, a planned All Black tour of South Africa was stopped by the New Zealand High Court. A rebel tour took place the next year by a team known as the Cavaliers, which consisted of all but two of the original squad. The Springboks won the series 3–1. In 1989, a World XV sanctioned by the International Rugby Board went on a mini-tour of South Africa; all traditional rugby nations bar New Zealand supplied players to the team.
South Africa was not permitted by the International Rugby Board to compete in the inaugural 1987 Rugby World Cup, nor in the following 1991 Rugby World Cup.

Rainbow nation and 1995 World Cup 
Apartheid was abolished during 1990–91, and the Springboks were readmitted to international rugby in 1992. They struggled to return to their pre-isolation standards in their first games after readmission. During the 1992 All Blacks tour, the first to South Africa since 1976, the Springboks were defeated 24–27 by New Zealand, and suffered a 3–26 loss to Australia the following month.

South Africa hosted the 1995 Rugby World Cup, with a surge of support for the Springboks among the white and black communities behind the slogan "one team, one country." This was the first major international sports event to be held in the Rainbow Nation. By the time they hosted the 1995 World Cup, the Springboks, coached by Kitch Christie, were seeded ninth. They won their pool by defeating Australia, Romania, and Canada. Wins in the quarter-final against Western Samoa (42–14) and in the semi-final against France (19–15) sent the Springboks to the final.
South Africa won the 1995 Rugby World Cup Final against the All Blacks 15–12 in extra-time.
President Nelson Mandela, wearing a Springbok shirt, presented the trophy to captain Francois Pienaar, a white Afrikaner. The gesture was widely seen as a major step towards the reconciliation of white and black South Africans.

A series of crises followed in 1995 through 1997. Christie resigned in 1996 due to leukaemia. South Africa struggled in the new Tri-Nations competition, the All Blacks won a test series in South Africa for the first time in 1996, and the Lions won their 1997 South African tour test series two games to one. Coach Andre Markgraaff was fired in 1997 due to a racist comment he made. The team suffered successive defeats in the Lions 1997 tour and the 1997 Tri Nations Series.

In 1997, coach Nick Mallett coached South Africa's unbeaten 1997 tour of Europe, and in 1998 the Boks tied the then-existing record for longest test winning streak, winning 17 consecutive tests, including the 1998 Tri-Nations.
At the 1999 Rugby World Cup the Springboks reached the semi-finals of the competition, where they lost to eventual champions .

During the 2002 and 2003 seasons, the Springboks lost by record margins to England (3–53), France, Scotland and New Zealand. At the 2003 Rugby World Cup, they were eliminated in the quarter-final round – their worst showing to date.

Following wins during the June 2004 tours, the Boks won the 2004 Tri Nations Series. The Springboks won the 2004 IRB International Team of the Year award. The Springboks finished second in the 2005 Tri-Nations.

The 2006 Springboks lost to France, ending their long undefeated home record. A poor 2006 Tri Nations Series included two losses to the Wallabies. Coach Jake White told the press in July 2006 that he had been unable to pick some white players for his squad "because of transformation"—a reference to the ANC government's policies to redress racial imbalances in sport.

2007 Rugby World Cup victory 

At the 2007 Rugby World Cup in France, the Springboks won their pool. The Springboks then defeated Fiji 37–20 in the quarter-finals, and Argentina 37–13 in the semi-finals. In the final they prevailed 15–6 over England to lift the Webb Ellis Cup for a second time.

In January 2008, Peter de Villiers was appointed as the first non-white coach of the Springboks. De Villiers's first squad included ten of colour. The team finishes last in the Tri Nations, but notched several wins during their 2008 end of year tour.

The 2009 season was more successful. The Boks earned a 2–1 series win over the Lions, and then won the 2009 Tri Nations Series. However, during the November tests they lost their top spot in the IRB rankings with losses to France and Ireland. Nonetheless, the Boks were named IRB International Team of the Year.

The Boks' June 2010 test campaign included a win over France (their first victory over the French since 2005).
However, the Boks performed poorly in the 2010 Tri Nations campaign, sliding to third in the world rankings.
In the 2011 Tri Nations the Boks rested a number of players in preparation for the upcoming World Cup. At the 2011 Rugby World Cup, the Springboks topped their group before falling to Australia 9–11 in the quarter-finals.

2018–present: The Erasmus/Kolisi era and 2019 Rugby World Cup victory 
Following the sacking of Allister Coetzee in February 2018, Rassie Erasmus was named head coach of the national team, alongside his duties as Director of Rugby at SA Rugby, on 1 March 2018 and immediately decided to appoint Siya Kolisi as the new Springbok captain, a landmark decision.

In his first match in charge, Erasmus awarded thirteen new players their first test cap, in a one-off match in Washington, D.C. in a 22–20 loss to Wales. A week later, he secured his first win, a 42–39 victory over England, during their three-test series. The series title was clinched in the second test, with the Springboks winning 23–12, to secure a series victory. However, South Africa were unable to gain the clean-sweep, after losing the third test, 25–10. During the 2018 Rugby Championship, Erasmus led the Springboks to second, their best placing since 2014. The 2018 Championship saw South Africa win three games, including a thrilling 36–34 victory over New Zealand in Wellington, South Africa's first win in New Zealand since 2009. Erasmus later revealed that had the Springboks lost that match, he would have resigned: "We [had recently] lost to Australia and Argentina, and if we didn't win in Wellington I would have resigned... I have never lost three games in a row as a coach and if I did that I don't deserve to be a Springbok coach. We played New Zealand in Wellington and that was important, as if we lost it I wouldn't be here." South Africa came within moments of reclaiming the Freedom Cup in the final round, but an All Black try in the dying moments of the game helped New Zealand snatch victory in 32–30 win in Pretoria and retain the cup.

The Springboks won the 2019 Rugby World Cup in Japan after defeating England 32–12 in the final. It was the first time that a Black South African rugby captain got to lift the Webb Ellis Cup, as well as the first time that a team won a final with a defeat in pool stages, the captain being Siya Kolisi who presented South African president Cyril Ramaphosa the number 6 jersey to commemorate Nelson Mandela, who wore the same numbered jersey during the 1995 Rugby World Cup.

The final match between South Africa and England served as a rematch between the two in reference to the 2007 Rugby World Cup final. This marks the third time South Africa has won the World Cup which ties the team with the All Blacks for most Rugby World Cup wins.

Crest and colours

Team name and emblem 
 
Paul Roos's team had first introduced the Springbok in 1906–07 tour of Britain in an attempt to prevent the British press from inventing their own name. At this point in time, it promoted a measure of unity among white English and Afrikaans-speaking players after the two Anglo-Boer Wars of the late 19th century. Although the Springbok was adopted briefly by the first coloured national rugby team in 1939 and by their first black counterparts in 1950, it became exclusively associated with segregated sporting codes afterwards. 

South African rugby officials in particular, and the national rugby team itself, have an historical association with racism from 1906 on. The Springbok was regarded as representing both the exclusion of players who were not designated white under apartheid legislation, and by extension of apartheid itself.  The first Springboks initially refused to play against a Devon side that included Jimmy Peters, the first black player to represent England. Legendary official, national coach, and Springbok scrumhalf Danie Craven had acquiesced with government officials who had demanded that Māori players be excluded from visiting All Black teams. Craven had also indicated that the Springbok was exclusively tied to the white identity of the national rugby team.

Since the demise of apartheid, the ruling African National Congress has wanted to replace the Springbok across all national teams, as emblem of the racially segregated sporting codes, with a neutral symbol that would represent a decisive break with a repressive past. The King Protea as South Africa's national flower was chosen for this purpose, so that the national cricket team became known as the Proteas, for example. A similar change was envisioned for the national rugby squads springbok emblem. As a result of political pressure the national rugby team jersey from 1992 on featured a king protea alongside the springbok.

As portrayed in the film Invictus, pressure to replace the Springbok as emblem for the rugby team came to a head in 1994, just before the Rugby World Cup that would take place in South Africa. As a result of Nelson Mandela's direct intervention (Mandela himself was a devoted fan of the Springbok rugby team), the ANC's executive decided not to do away with the emblem at the time, but to reappropriate it. After the national team won the 1995 Rugby World Cup, black rugby pioneer Dan Qeqe said that "The Springboks play for all of us".

In March 2004 the South African Sports Commission ratified a decision that the protea be the official rugby emblem on blazers and caps, with the concession that the springbok could remain on the team jersey and the traditional Springbok colours. And in November 2007 the ANC's special conference at Polokwane again endorsed the need for a single symbol for all sporting codes. While critics like Qondisa Ngwenya foresaw a loss of revenue from dumping the springbok emblem, others like Cheeky Watson urged the need for an alternative, unifying symbol.

Jersey 

South Africa play in green jerseys with a gold collar and trim, white shorts and green socks. The jersey is embroidered with the SA Rugby logo on the wearer's left chest and the springbok logo on the right chest. 

The first shirt worn by South Africa was a navy blue one in their Tests against the British Isles during the Lions tour of 1891. 

The green jersey was first adopted when the British Isles toured South Africa in 1903. After playing the first two Tests in white shirts, South Africa wore a green jersey (supplied by the Diocesan College rugby team) for the first time in their final Test at Newlands. On their first tour to Great Britain and Ireland in 1906–07 South Africa wore a green jersey with white collar, blue shorts, and blue socks taken from the Diocesan College. 

When Australia first toured South Africa in 1933, the visitors wore sky blue jerseys to avoid confusion, as at the time, both wore dark green jerseys. In 1953, when Australia toured again, the Springboks wore white jerseys for the test matches. In 1961 Australia changed their jersey to gold to avoid further colour clashes. 

In 2006 against Ireland in Dublin, to mark the centenary of the Springbok rugby team., a replica of the first jersey was worn.
 
In December 2008, the SARU decided to place the protea on the left side of the Boks' jersey, in line with other South African national teams, and move the springbok to the right side of the jersey. The  was worn for the first time during the British & Irish Lions' 2009 tour of South Africa.

In 2015 for the 2015 Rugby World Cup, the springbok was moved from the front of the jersey to the right sleeve while the Protea remained on the front. This was due to World Cup regulations stating that only the IRB logo and the main team logo could go on the front of the shirt.  Several South African rugby fans voiced their disappointment and anger at the reveal of the 2015 shirt as a result of the springbok not being on the front of the shirt.

2017 saw the Springboks wear a red change jersey at Argentina as part of an Asics promotion where the Springboks and Blitzboks wore jerseys in all the colours of the South African flag during the course of the season—the main side wore green, white, and red shirts, while the sevens team turned out in gold, blue and black uniforms.

Sponsors on kit 
Japanese company ASICS is the kit provider for all the South Africa rugby teams, through an agreement signed with the SARU. South Africa's shirt sponsor is local mobile phone provider MTN Group. Additional uniform sponsors are FNB on the back above the numbers, and Betway, FlySafair, Dell, and Switch Energy Drink rotating on the rear hems of the shorts.

* In a 2001 autumn international against France in Saint-Denis, the logo on their kit was replaced by Charles (which is an allusion to Charles Glass, the founder of Castle Brewery) because of the Evin law, which prohibits alcohol companies from advertising during sports events in France.

Home grounds 
The Springboks do not use a single stadium as their home, but they play out of a number of venues throughout South Africa. 

The first South African international took place in 1891 at Port Elizabeth's Crusader Grounds. The playing field, which is shared with the Port Elizabeth Cricket Club, is also known as St George's Park Cricket Ground.

Main stadiums

The 60,000 seat Ellis Park Stadium in Johannesburg was the main venue for the 1995 World Cup, where the Springboks defeated the All Blacks in the final. Ellis Park was built in 1928, and in 1955 hosted a record 100,000 people in a Test between South Africa and the British & Irish Lions.

The Springboks are said to have a notable advantage over touring sides when playing at high altitude on the Highveld. Games at Ellis Park, Loftus Versfeld, or Vodacom Park are said to present physical problems, and to influence a match in a number of other ways, such as the ball travelling further when kicked. Experts disagree on whether touring team's traditionally poor performances at altitude are more due to a state of mind rather than an actual physical challenge.

Other stadiums

The Springboks played their first test match at Soccer City on 21 August 2010, a Tri Nations match against New Zealand.

Records 
List of South Africa national rugby union team records

Rankings 

 World Rugby Ranking Leaders 

South Africa is one of the most successful rugby union teams in history. When the ranking system was first introduced in October 2003, South Africa were ranked sixth. Their ranking fluctuated until their victory in the 2007 Rugby World Cup briefly sent them to the summit of the rankings.

Overall, the South African Springboks and the New Zealand All Blacks have held the number 1 ranking in the world rankings since its introduction in October 2003 for just over 93% of the time (with the New Zealand All Blacks holding the top spot for just over 80% of the time and the South African Springboks holding the top spot for just over 13% of that time). The remaining time at the top of the world rankings are shared between the leading Northern Hemisphere teams, England (the only Northern Hemisphere team to win a World Cup title in 2003), Wales, France and Ireland.

The South African Springboks also share a record 3 World Cup titles (1995, 2007 and 2019) with the New Zealand All Blacks (1987, 2011 and 2015) and currently have an overall winning % against all nations (including the British and Irish Lions) except for the New Zealand All Blacks.

Games played

Tournaments

Rugby Championship 
The Springboks only yearly tournament is The Rugby Championship (formerly Tri-Nations), involving Australia and New Zealand since 1996, with Argentina joining the competition in 2012. The Springboks has won the tournament four times (1998, 2004, 2009, 2019). South Africa also participates in the Mandela Challenge Plate with Australia, and the Freedom Cup with New Zealand as part of the Rugby Championship.

Rugby World Cup 

The Springboks did not participate in the 1987 and 1991 World Cups because of the sporting boycott that apartheid brought against them. South Africa's introduction to the event was as hosts. They defeated the defending Champions Australia 27–18 in the opening match, and went on to defeat the All Blacks 15–12 after extra time in the 1995 Rugby World Cup Final, with a drop goal from 40 metres by Joel Stransky.

In 1999 South Africa experienced their first World Cup loss when they were defeated 21–27 by Australia in their Semi-Final, they went on to defeat the All Blacks 22–18 in the Third-Fourth play-off match. The worst ever South African performance at a World Cup was in 2003 when they lost a pool game to England, and then were knocked out of the tournament by the All Blacks in their Quarter-Final. In 2007 the Springboks defeated Fiji in the Quarter-Final's and Argentina in the Semi-Final's. They then defeated England in the Grand Final 15–6 to win the tournament for a second time. In 2011 the Springboks were defeated by Australia 9–11 in the Quarter-Final's after winning all four of their pool games.

In the 2015 World Cup, South Africa suffered a 32–34 loss to Japan in their first pool match on 19 September, and it has been regarded as one of the biggest upset's in Rugby Union history. They made it to the Semi-Final's but were eventually defeated by the All Blacks 20-18.

In the 2019 RWC, the Springboks lost their first pool match against the All Blacks 23-13, and they than won the rest of their pool matches to advance to the Quarter-Finals, where they beat Japan 26-3, than they beat Wales 19-16 in the Semi-Final's and then they beat England 32-12 in the Grand Final to be crowned the World Champions. South Africa becomes the 2nd country ever to win the Rugby World Cup 3 times.

Series played (Home and Away) 
Traditionally, most of the Test Matches against other countries happened during Tours/Series. The first team to visit South Africa were the British Lions in 1891 and the first Springbok overseas tour was arranged in 1906–07 to Europe.

 Bold = Series Win; Brackets() = Series Drawn, Plain Text = Series Lost

Overall

Head To Head Results 
Below is the Test Matches played by South Africa up until 26 November 2022. Only fixtures recognised as Test Matches by the South African Rugby Union are listed.

± The Cavaliers was the name given to an unofficial (rebel) New Zealand team that toured South Africa in 1986. The New Zealand Rugby Union did not sanction the team and do not recognise the side as a New Zealand representative team.

Players

Selection Policy 
Strategic Transformation Development Plan 2030 (STDP 2030): The Transformation Charter adopted at a sports Indaba in 2011 was a ‘one-size fits all’ mechanism to guide sport towards the achievement of the longer term transformation goal of an accessible, equitable, sustainable, competitive and demographically representative sport system. 

In the case of demographic representation for example, STDP 2030 target of 60% generic Black (black African, Coloured and Indian representation) was set and is the current milestone towards the ultimate goal of a sport demographic profile in line with the national population demographic of 80% black African, 9% Coloured, 9% White and 2% Indian.  However the targets are not legally enforceable quotas.

Current squad 
On 28 October, Head Coach Jacques Nienaber named a 35-Man squad for their 2022 End-of-Year Tour, playing against Ireland, France, Italy and England.

 Caps Updated: 26 November 2022

Head Coach:  Jacques Nienaber

Notable players

Individual records 

South Africa's most capped player is Victor Matfield with 127 caps. The most-capped back is Bryan Habana. Percy Montgomery holds the South African record for Test points with 893, which at the time of his international retirement placed him sixth on the all-time list of Test point scorers (he now stands ninth).

John Smit was the world's most-capped captain, having captained South Africa in 82 of his 111 Tests, but has since been overtaken. Smit also played a record 46 consecutive matches for South Africa.

The record try scorer is Bryan Habana with 67 tries.(as of 14 February 2018)

As of 8 October 2019, Cobus Reinach scored the earliest hat-trick in World Cup history.

Hall of Fame 

Twelve former South African international players have been inducted into either the International Rugby Hall of Fame or the World Rugby Hall of Fame.

 Barry "Fairy" Heatlie played 6 Tests between 1896 and 1903.
 Bennie Osler played 17 consecutive Tests between 1924 and 1933.
 Danie Craven played 16 Tests between 1931 and 1938.
 Hennie Muller played 13 Tests between 1949 and 1953.
 Frik du Preez played 38 Tests between 1961 and 1971.
 Morné du Plessis played 22 Tests between 1971 and 1980.
 Naas Botha played 28 Tests between 1980 and 1992.
 Danie Gerber played 24 Tests between 1980 and 1992.
 Francois Pienaar played 29 Tests between 1993 and 1996.
 Joost van der Westhuizen played 89 Tests between 1993 and 2003.
 Os du Randt played 80 Tests between 1994 and 2007.
 John Smit played 111 Tests between 2000 and 2011. He ended his international career as the most-capped Springbok in history.

In addition to players, the World Rugby Hall of Fame has also inducted the following people:
 Kitch Christie, coach of the 1995 Rugby World Cup-winning team.
 Jake White, coach of the 2007 Rugby World Cup-winning team.
 Nelson Mandela for his impact on the sport.

Coaches

Current coaching staff 

The current coaching staff of the South African national team was revealed on 24 January 2020:

Former coaches 
The role and definition of the South Africa coach has varied significantly over the team's history. Hence a comprehensive list of coaches, or head selectors, is impossible. The following table is a list of coaches since the 1949 All Blacks tour to South Africa.
Both World Cup-winning coaches, Christie and White, were inducted into the IRB Hall of Fame in 2011 alongside all other World Cup-winning head coaches through the 2007 edition.

In popular culture 
The combined exploits of Mandela and the Springboks in helping unify the country through rugby union was later chronicled in John Carlin's book Playing the Enemy: Nelson Mandela and the Game that Made a Nation, which in turn inspired Clint Eastwood's 2009 Academy Award-nominated film Invictus starring Matt Damon as Pienaar and Morgan Freeman as Mandela.

The conquest of the 2019 title was filmed through a 5-episode SuperSport documentary, named Chasing the Sun.

See also 

 List of South Africa rugby union test matches
 List of Springboks
 Rugby union in South Africa
 South Africa national sevens team
 South African rugby union captains
 Junior Boks
 South Africa women's national rugby union team

References

Notes

Sources 

 "United Nations, India and the boycott of Apartheid sport" anc.org.za. Retrieved 6 August 2006
 "1000000 years of SA rugby contact with France" planet-rugby.com. Retrieved 6 August 2006
 The colours – 1906 – 2006 planet-rugby.com. Retrieved 14 November 2006
 
 
 
 Strategic Transformation Development Plan 2030 Cycle 1 https://www.springboks.rugby/general/governance-and-documents/

Bibliography

External links 
 
 
 Springbok Rugby Hall of Fame
 Charles Villet, "Cape Crusaders: why some South Africans (still) support the Kiwis, not the Springboks" in "The Converstion"

 
African national rugby union teams
Laureus World Sports Awards winners